Celluloide is a 1996 Italian historical drama film directed by Carlo Lizzani from a screenplay by Furio Scarpelli, Ugo Pirro and Lizzani, based on the 1983 novel of the same name by Pirro. It stars Giancarlo Giannini, Massimo Ghini, Anna Falchi, and Lina Sastri.

Plot 
The story revolves around the difficult production of Roberto Rossellini's film Rome, Open City (1945).

Cast
Giancarlo Giannini as Sergio Amidei
Massimo Ghini as Roberto Rossellini
Anna Falchi as Maria Michi
Lina Sastri as Anna Magnani
Massimo Dapporto as Giuseppe Amato
Antonello Fassari as Aldo Fabrizi
Milva as The Countess
Christopher Walken as US Officer Rod E. Geiger
Massimo Ciavarro as Massimo Serato
Francesca Ventura as Jone Tuzi, the script supervisor
Francesco Siciliano as Federico Fellini

Giuliano Montaldo has an uncredited cameo as Civalleri, one of the film's early financers.

Production 
The film was a passion project of Lizzani's, who tried to get it financed since 1983. Sabrina Ferilli was originally chosen to play Magnani, but ended up refusing. Principal photography began on 8 May 1995 in Rome.

Accolades

References

External links

1996 films
1990s historical drama films
Italian historical drama films
1990s Italian-language films
Films about films
Films shot in Rome
Films set in Rome
Films set in 1944
Films directed by Carlo Lizzani
Roberto Rossellini
Films with screenplays by Ugo Pirro
1990s Italian films